Antonio Demetric Dingle (born October 7, 1976) is an American football defensive tackle for the Cape Fear Heroes of the American Arena League (AAL). He played in the National Football League (NFL) for the Green Bay Packers and the Carolina Panthers. Dingle played collegiately for the University of Virginia before being drafted by the Pittsburgh Steelers in the 7th round of the 1999 NFL Draft. Dingle played for the Packers and Panthers in 1999. On March 25, 2002, Dingle signed with the Carolina Cobras. He has also played for the Rochester Brigade, New York Dragons, Tulsa Talons, Quad City Steamwheelers, Oklahoma City Yard Dawgz, Central Valley Coyotes, Florida Firecats, and Fayetteville Force.

References

External links
Just Sports Stats

1976 births
Living people
Sportspeople from Fayetteville, North Carolina
Players of American football from North Carolina
American football defensive tackles
Virginia Cavaliers football players
Green Bay Packers players
Carolina Panthers players
Scottish Claymores players
Las Vegas Outlaws (XFL) players
Carolina Cobras players
Rochester Brigade players
New York Dragons players
Tulsa Talons players
Quad City Steamwheelers players
Oklahoma City Yard Dawgz players
Central Valley Coyotes players
Florida Firecats players
Cape Fear Heroes players
Indoor American football players